PSK Reporter is an amateur radio signal reporting and spotting network and website started by Philip Gladstone in 2014 which allows operators to see where their radio signals are being received. The platform works by collecting digital signal reports from software clients such as WSJT and FLDIGI then mapping them to show which stations are being heard by other clients. The website takes its name from the popular amateur radio digital mode PSK31 and supports numerous digital modes, but now a vast majority of digital modes recorded by the service are FT8 traffic. Most traffic recorded on PSK Reporter is in the HF amateur radio bands but the platform also supports MF, VHF, and UHF bands. As of 2021 PSK Reporter has collected over 20 billion reception reports.

Scientific uses 
Reporting networks such as PSK Reporter allow researchers in near real time evaluate space weather conditions particularly changes in the earth's ionosphere. There are multiple examples of PSK Reporter being used to aid researchers as well as aiding in the prediction and understand of radio propagation. For examples observations made during the 2017 eclipse where over 5,000 amateur radio operators reception reports helped researchers document the eclipses effect on HF communications. Additionally data used can help improve machine learning algorithms predict HF propagation.

In addition to the aiding researchers in understanding HF radio propagation there is significant use of the platform in understanding VHF radio propagation. As well as use data to evaluate and test the performance of installed antennas.

See also 
PSK Reporter Homepage

References 

Websites
Amateur radio